The Journal of Medieval Religious Cultures is a peer-reviewed academic journal that publishes essays on mystical and devotional texts, especially from the Western Middle Ages. It is published twice a year by Penn State University Press. The journal previously went by the names 14th Century English Mystics Newsletter (1974-1983) and Mystics Quarterly (1984-2008).

External links 
 

English-language journals
Penn State University Press academic journals
Biannual journals
Publications established in 1974
Religious studies journals